Home Before Dark can refer to the following: 

 Home Before Dark, the twenty-seventh studio album by American singer-songwriter Neil Diamond
 Home Before Dark (film), the 1958 motion picture
 Home Before Dark (TV series), an American mystery drama web television series
 Home Before Dark (novel), a 2020 thriller novel by Riley Sager